Mark Cousins (born 3 May 1965) is a Northern Irish director and writer based in Edinburgh. A prolific documentarian, he is best known for his 15-hour 2011 documentary The Story of Film: An Odyssey.

Career
Cousins interviewed famous filmmakers such as David Lynch, Martin Scorsese and Roman Polanski in the TV series Scene by Scene. He presented the BBC cult film series Moviedrome from June 1997 to July 2000. He introduced 66 films for the show, including the little-seen Nicolas Roeg film Eureka.

Throughout his career, Cousins has interviewed directors, producers and actors including Steven Spielberg, Woody Allen, Tom Hanks, Sean Connery, Brian De Palma, Steve Martin, Lauren Bacall, Jane Russell, Paul Schrader, Bernardo Bertolucci, Kirk Douglas, Jeanne Moreau, Terence Stamp, Jack Lemmon, Janet Leigh and Rod Steiger.

In 2009, Cousins and Tilda Swinton co-founded the '8/2 Foundation'. Together they also created a project where they mounted a 33.5-tonne portable cinema on a large truck which was physically pulled through the Scottish Highlands. The traveling independent film festival was featured prominently in a documentary called Cinema is Everywhere. The festival was repeated in 2011.

His 2011 film The Story of Film: An Odyssey was broadcast as 15 one-hour television episodes on More4, and later, featured at the 2011 Toronto International Film Festival. In September 2013, it began to be shown on Turner Classic Movies. Drawing on its exhaustive film library, TCM complemented each episode with relevant short films and feature films ranging from the familiar to the rarely seen. TCM received a 2013 Peabody Award "for its inclusive, uniquely annotated survey of world cinema history".

After The Story of Film, Cousins' next project was intentionally a small-scale work: What Is This Film Called Love? is a self-photographed diary of his three-day walk around Mexico City, accompanied by his imagined conversation with a photo of Sergei Eisenstein and reviewed as "fatuous" by Variety. Another low-budget, quickly produced documentary, Here Be Dragons, covers a short film-watching trip he made to Albania and was also poorly received as indulgent and "random".

6 Desires: DH Lawrence and Sardinia is structured around an imagined letter from Cousins to the author D. H. Lawrence, who wrote about a 1921 visit to Sardinia. Life May Be was a collaboration with Iranian director and actor Mania Akbari, again making use of Cousins' familiar structural devices of letters, travel imagery, and voiceover commentary, judged "self-advertisement".<ref>Andrew Pulver, " Life May Be: Edinburgh 2014 review – intensely felt passion with a sense of self-advertisement.  Mark Cousins' latest essay film is a two-way love letter to Iranian artist-film-maker Mania Akbari, with intriguing results." The Guardian, 21 June 2014.</ref>A Story of Children and Film was critically well-received. Its origins lay in some footage he shot of his niece and nephew at play, and grew into a documentary about the representation of children in cinema.Peter DeBruge, "Cannes Film Review: 'A Story of Children and Film', Variety, 18 May 2013.Mark Kermode, " A Story of Children and Film review – Mark Cousins' 'spine-tingling' visual essay" Mark Cousins' film exploring childhood and film is dazzling in its breadth and intelligence", The Guardian, 5 April 2014. ("A hugely impressive work by a uniquely talented storyteller.")

Cousins subsequently wrote and directed I Am Belfast, in which the city is personified by a 10,000-year-old woman.  Portions of the film in progress, with a score by Belfast composer David Holmes were screened at the 2014 Belfast Film Festival. He is also working on a three-hour addendum to The Story of Film, on the subject of documentaries, entitled Dear John Grierson.

Cousins famously axed his own film Bigger Than The Shining following a screening in front of a live audience at the 2017 International Rotterdam Film Festival (IFFR). This was done with the intention being for it to never be shown again, as it was the only copy of the film.

Cousins is the Co-Artistic Director of 'Cinema China', 'The Ballerina Ballroom Cinema of Dreams' and 'A Pilgrimage' with Tilda Swinton. Together with Antonia Bird, Robert Carlyle and Irvine Welsh, Cousins is a director of the production company 4Way Pictures. Between 2001 and 2011, he wrote for Prospect, Cousins now writes for Sight & Sound and Filmkrant.

Cousins was appointed Honorary Professor of the University of Glasgow in 2013, as well as Honorary Doctor of Letters at both the University of Edinburgh in 2007 and University of Stirling in 2014. He is now a Patron of the Edinburgh International Film Festival, Cousins previously acted as both a programmer and director (1996–1997) of the festival.

He has made regular appearances on Mark Kermode's YouTube Channel "Kermode Uncut".

He is Chairperson of the Belfast Film Festival, and a board member of Michael Moore's Traverse City Film Festival and a Member of the 'Audentia Award' jury at the 42nd Göteborg International Film Festival (GIFF) in 2019, as well as Member of the 'Official Competition' jury at the 53rd Karlovy Vary International Film Festival in 2018.

In 2019, Cousins was elected a Fellow of the Royal Society of Edinburgh. In 2021, Cousins joined the jury of the BFI London Film Festival.

His film The Story of Film: A New Generation opened Cannes Film Festival 2021.

Personal life

Born in Coventry, England, Cousins was raised in Ballymena, County Antrim, Northern Ireland (where he attended St Louis Grammar School), and graduated in film, television and art at the University of Stirling.Henry Hepburn, "Mark Cousins" , TESS, 21 September 2012. Since 1984 he has been in a longterm personal relationship with Gill Moreton, a psychologist, whom he met at Stirling; they live in Edinburgh.Fiona Reed, "Lip service rustles up a real glass act", The Scotsman, 12 June 1999 .

 Filmography 

 Bibliography 

Awards and nominations

Festivals accolations

References

External links

 
 
 Mark Cousins articles at Prospect magazine (registration required)
 Mark Cousins articles at The Guardian''

Living people
Film directors from Northern Ireland
1965 births
Alumni of the University of Stirling